The 1978 Arizona Wildcats football team represented the University of Arizona in the Pacific-10 Conference (Pac-10) during the 1978 NCAA Division I-A football season.  In their second season under head coach Tony Mason, the Wildcats compiled a 5–6 record (3–4 against Pac-10 opponents), finished in a tie for sixth place in the Pac-10, and outscored their opponents, 245 to 205.  The team played its home games in Arizona Stadium in Tucson, Arizona. This is the first year in which Arizona, along with rival Arizona State, joined the Pac-10 (previously the Pac-8 prior to both Arizona schools’ joining the conference).

The team's statistical leaders included Jim Krohn with 991 passing yards, Hubert Oliver with 866 rushing yards, and Ron Beyer with 296 receiving yards. Linebacker Sam Giangardella led the team with 131 total tackles.

Before the season
Arizona and Arizona State joined the Pac-8 prior to the start of the 1978 season after spending several years as members of the Western Athletic Conference (WAC). The Pac-8 was then renamed the Pac-10 after the two schools joined the conference. Both schools went to the Pac-10 to compete for championships and that the conference had more money in revenue and more scholarships offered. The Wildcats finished the 1977 season with a record of 5–7 in Mason's first season with the team.

Schedule

Personnel

Game summaries

Kansas State
In the season opener, Arizona played their first game as a Pac-10 member and faced Kansas State (whose nickname was also the Wildcats, like Arizona). Arizona would dominate the game in a shutout win.

Oregon State
In Arizona's first Pac-10 game, they defeated Oregon State to improve on their record. It was their first home win over a Pac-10 opponent.

Michigan
The Wildcats went on the road at Michigan for only their second meeting against the Wolverines (the first was in 1970, also on the road). Arizona fought hard with third-ranked Michigan, and ultimately came up short at a chance of an upset.

UCLA
In their first Pac-10 road game, Arizona traveled to UCLA and faced the No. 10 Bruins. The Wildcats would end up losing to the Bruins for their first Pac-10 road loss.

Oregon
Arizona went to Oregon and defeated the Ducks to win their first road Pac-10 game.

Arizona State
Arizona and Arizona State met in their first rivalry matchup as Pac-10 members. In a back and forth game, Arizona State led late in the fourth quarter and the Wildcats had a chance to possibly win it, but missed a field goal to lose.

Season notes
 Arizona's season was heavily affected by a difficult schedule, especially by the transition to the Pac-10 and with games against tough opponents that were ranked in the top 20 at one point. The Wildcats played three ranked teams and subsequently lost to all of them.
 Due to their move to the Pac-10, the Wildcats did not play rival New Mexico for the first time since 1946.
 In late September through early October, the Wildcats played against two consecutive Big Ten teams and earned a split.
 The loss to California was Arizona's first in a Pac-10 game as well as their first home loss in a Pac-10 game.
 Arizona and UCLA played on a Friday due to the fact that UCLA and USC shared the same stadium (Los Angeles Memorial Coliseum) at the time. The day after UCLA's victory over the Wildcats (which was a Saturday), USC played California at the Coliseum.
 The game against Arizona State was the last time that the Wildcats faced legendary ASU coach Frank Kush, who was fired midway through the 1979 season after mistreating one of his players. Arizona won only five times against Kush's Sun Devils dating back to 1958.
 Arizona did not play against Pac-10 members USC or Stanford this season.

References

Arizona
Arizona Wildcats football seasons
Arizona Wildcats football